Prince Abdul Aziz bin Musa'ed Stadium is a multi-purpose stadium in Ha'il, Saudi Arabia.  It is currently used mostly for football matches and is the home stadium of Al-Ta'ee.  The stadium has a capacity of 12,250 people.

Football venues in Saudi Arabia
Multi-purpose stadiums in Saudi Arabia